This is the solo discography of Scottish musician Edwyn Collins. For his work with Orange Juice, see Orange Juice discography.

Albums

Studio albums

Live albums

Soundtrack albums

Compilation albums

Video albums

EPs

Singles

Contributions

References

Discographies of British artists
Pop music discographies
Rock music discographies